The 2019 Asian Archery Championships were the 21st edition of the event, and were held in Bangkok, Thailand from 22 to 28 November 2019.

Medal summary

Recurve

Compound

Medal table

 Athletes from India competed as Olympic Athlete (WA) due to the suspension of the country's national federation.

References
 Medal standings
 Medalists

External links
 World Archery Link

2019 in archery
2019 in Thai sport
Asian Archery Championships
International archery competitions hosted by Thailand